Michel Bergeron (born November 11, 1954) is a Canadian retired ice hockey right winger. He played in the National Hockey League with the Detroit Red Wings, New York Islanders, and Washington Capitals between 1975 and 1979.

Early life 
As a youth, he played in the 1966 Quebec International Pee-Wee Hockey Tournament with a minor ice hockey team from Chicoutimi.

Career 
Drafted in 1974 by both the Detroit Red Wings of the National Hockey League and the Quebec Nordiques of the World Hockey Association, Bergeron also played for the New York Islanders and Washington Capitals.

Career statistics

Regular season and playoffs

References

External links
 
 Profile at hockeydraftcentral.com

1954 births
Living people
Canadian ice hockey right wingers
Detroit Red Wings draft picks
Detroit Red Wings players
Fort Worth Texans players
French Quebecers
Ice hockey people from Quebec
Kalamazoo Wings (1974–2000) players
Kansas City Blues players
Milwaukee Admirals (IHL) players
New York Islanders players
Nova Scotia Voyageurs players
Quebec Nordiques (WHA) draft picks
Sorel Éperviers players
Sportspeople from Saguenay, Quebec
Virginia Wings players
Washington Capitals players